Little Thoughts may refer to:
Little Thoughts (EP), Bloc Party EP
"Little Thoughts"/"Tulips", Bloc Party CD single